Gallop Racer 2004, known in Japan as , and in the PAL region as Gallop Racer 2, is a horse racing video game developed and published by Tecmo, released in 2004 for the PlayStation 2.

Reception

The game received "average" reviews according to the review aggregation website Metacritic. In Japan, Famitsu gave it a score of three eights and one seven for a total of 31 out of 40.

References

External links
 

2004 video games
Arcade video games
Horse racing video games
Koei Tecmo franchises
PlayStation 2 games
PlayStation 2-only games
Tecmo games
Video games developed in Japan
Video game sequels
Video games set in 2004
Multiplayer and single-player video games